= El Aybal =

Coordinates: 29°07′S 65°21′W

- Municipality and village
- Interactive map of El Aybal
- Country: Argentina
- Province: Catamarca Province
- Time zone: UTC−3 (ART)

El Aybal is a village and municipality in Catamarca Province in northwestern Argentina.

== Population ==
According to the 1991 national census (INDEC), El Aybal had 106 inhabitants. In the 2001 census, the population decreased to 64 inhabitants. The 2010 census registered 68 inhabitants, of whom 37 were men and 31 were women.
